Shannon Te Ao (born in Sydney in 1978) is a New Zealand artist and writer of Ngāti Tūwharetoa descent. He won the 2016 Walters Prize.

Education

Te Ao completed a Bachelor of Fine Arts (Honours) and a Graduate Diploma of Teaching at the University of Auckland.

Walters Prize

Te Ao was the sole New Zealand artist selected for the 19th Biennale of Sydney in 2014. His video work two shoots that stretch far out (2013-2014) was shown at the Art Gallery of New South Wales for the Biennale. In 2015 the work was shown at City Gallery Wellington alongside drawings by Susan Te Kahurangi King in the exhibition Susan Te Kahurangi King and Shannon Te Ao: From the One I Call My Own.

In March 2016 Te Ao was announced as a finalist for the biennial Walters Prize (New Zealand's largest visual arts prize) for the work. For his presentation in the Walters Prize exhibition at Auckland Art Gallery Te Ao showed two shoots that stretch far out in one room, and in a space leading in to the screening installed Okea ururoatia (never say die) (2016), made of living plants arranged on pallets and lit by hanging lights. He was announced as the winner on 30 September 2016; the award was judged by Doryun Chong.

Exhibitions

2013
Follow the Party of the Whale, The Blue Oyster Art Project Space

2014
Follow the Party of the Whale, Adam Art Gallery
 19th Biennale of Sydney 
Towards doing more, The Physics Room

2015
Shannon Te Ao: A torch and a light (cover), Te Tuhi Centre for the Arts
Susan Te Kahurangi King and Shannon Te Ao: From the One I Call My Own, City Gallery Wellington

2016
Shannon Te Ao: A torch and a light (cover), Hastings City Art Gallery 
 Walters Prize Award, Auckland Art Gallery
Shannon Te Ao: Untitled (malady), Robert Heald Gallery, Wellington

2017
Shannon Te Ao: Tēnei Ao Kawa Nei, Christchurch Art Gallery
Shannon Te Ao: Untitled (McCahon House Studies), City Gallery Wellington
 te huka o te tai, Artspace, Auckland
Shannon Te Ao: With the sun aglow, I have my pensive moods, Edinburgh Art Festival

2018
 Shannon Te Ao: my life as a tunnel, The Dowse Art Museum

Further information

Interviews

 Five Minutes With Shannon Te Ao, The Brag, 2014
 Shannon Te Ao interviewed by Mark Amery, Circuit, 23 July 2015
 Shannon Te Ao interviewed by Kim Hill, Saturday Morning programme, RNZ, 1 October 2016
 Shannon Te Ao interviewed by Nathan Pohio, Bulletin, Christchurch Art Gallery, February 2017
 Shannon Te Ao interviewed by Lynn Freeman, Standing Room Only, RNZ, 2 July 2017

Reviews

 Courtney Johnston, Review of Susan Te Kahurangi King and Shannon Te Ao: From the One I Call My Own, Nine to Noon programme, RNZ, 1 July 2015
Mark Amery Review of Susan Te Kahurangi King and Shannon Te Ao: From the One I Call My Own, NZ Listener, 2 July 2015
 John Hurrell, A New Shannon Te Ao Video, EyeContact, 15 July 2015
 Jessica Hubbard Searching for a Nonverbal Connection, EyeContact, 7 October 2015
 Megan Dunn, The Abode of Indifference, Circuit, 11 October 2015
 John Hurrell, More Is Less: The Walters Prize 2016, EyeContact, 7 August 2016
 Tim Cornwall, Edinburgh Art Festival: artists look to Maori traditions, 19th-century botany and jellyfish, The Art Newspaper, 25 July 2017 
 Laura Cumming, Edinburgh art festival review – the dark side of Robert Burns, The Observer, 30 July 2017.
En Liang Khong Critic’s Guide: Edinburgh, Frieze, 1 August 2017
 Andrew Clifford Shannon Te Ao: With the sun aglow, I have my pensive moods, Contemporary Hum, 4 December 2017
 Matariki Williams, The Singing Word: On Shannon Te Ao’s my life as a tunnel, The Pantograph Punch, 22 June 2018
 Alex Davidson, Critic's pick: Shannon Te Ao, Artforum, July 2018
 Fi Churchman, Future Greats: Shannon Te Ao, Art Review Asia, Summer 2018

Books

An artist book, I can press my face up against the glass, was published by The Physics Room in 2014. It features essays by Tina Barton, Caterina Riva and Anna-Marie White.

A chapter on Te Ao's work is included in New Zealand writer Anthony Byrt's 2016 book This Model World: Travels to the Edge of Contemporary Art. A still from his 2014 work two shoots that stretch far out was used for the cover of the book.

References

1978 births
New Zealand contemporary artists
Living people
New Zealand Māori artists
Ngāti Tūwharetoa people
University of Auckland alumni